Alexander Shakirov (born 20 January 1981) is a Russian rugby union player. He plays as a scrum-half and also as a fly-half.

He currently plays for VVA-Podmoskovye Monino, in the Russian Professional League.

Shakirov had 58 caps for Russia, with 5 tries, 25 points in aggregate, from 2004 to 2014. He was called for the 2011 Rugby World Cup, where he played in three games against United States national rugby union team, Italy national rugby union team and Australia national rugby union team. Total of 123 minutes.

His debut for Russia was the game played in Tbilisi against Georgia on 6 March 2004.

References

Russia international rugby union players
Living people
1981 births
Russian rugby union players
Rugby union scrum-halves
Rugby union fly-halves